Francis Van den Eynde (1 April 1946 – 4 March 2021) was a Belgian politician. He was heavily involved in the Flemish Movement and was part of the Vlaams Blok and Vlaams Belang. He served in the Chamber of Representatives from 1991 to 2010.

References

1946 births
2021 deaths
20th-century Belgian politicians
21st-century Belgian politicians
Flemish activists
People's Union (Belgium) politicians
Vlaams Belang politicians
Members of the Flemish Parliament
Members of the Chamber of Representatives (Belgium)
Politicians from Brussels